Acacia costata is a shrub belonging to the genus Acacia and the subgenus Phyllodineae that is endemic to Western Australia.

Description
The pungent, rigid, green phyllodes have a narrowly lanceolate shape and are straight or shallowly recurved. It blooms from May to June and produces yellow flowers. The simple inflorescences occur singly in the axils. The spherical flower-heads contain 13 to 19 golden flowers that are loosely bound.

Taxonomy
The species was first formally described by the botanist George Bentham in 1942 as part of William Jackson Hooker's work Notes on Mimoseae, with a synopsis of species as published in the London Journal of Botany. It is often confused with Acacia acutata.

Distribution
It is native to an area along the west coast in the Wheatbelt region of Western Australia between Dandaragan in the north to Mundaring in the south and Dowerin in the east. It is usually found on lateritic ridges and sandplains growing in sandy or gravelly soils as a part of heathland communities.

See also
 List of Acacia species

References

costata
Acacias of Western Australia
Plants described in 1842
Taxa named by George Bentham